Spinneret principally refers to the silk spinning organ on a spider, silk worm, or insect larvae.

Spinneret may also refer to:
Spinneret (polymers), a device used to extrude polymers into fibers (by analogy with a spider)
Spinneret (novel), a novel by Timothy Zahn
Spinneret (Marvel Comics), a comic-book character related to the High Evolutionary
Spinneret, a web server board made by Parallax, Inc.

See also
Spinnerette, an alternative rock project